Lorenzo Laverone (born 19 April 1989) is an Italian footballer who plays as a defender for  club Rimini.

Club career
Born in Bagno a Ripoli, Tuscany, Laverone started his career at Tuscan club Prato. In 2007, he was signed by Colligiana. The club finished as the triple runner-up in the promotion playoffs and Group E of 2007–08 Serie D, and in 2007–08 Coppa Italia Serie D. The club received a wild card to 2008–09 Lega Pro Seconda Divisione on 31 July.

In 2009 Laverone was signed by Lega Pro Prima Divisione club Arezzo. After the bankruptcy of the club in 2010, Laverone was signed by Serie B club Reggina.

Sassuolo
In 2011 Laverone was sold to fellow Serie B club Sassuolo in a co-ownership deal in a 3-year contract for €280,000 transfer fee. In January 2012 Laverone was signed by fellow second division club Nocerina.

Laverone returned to Sassuolo in 2012–13 Serie B. The club won promotion to Serie A at the end of season. In June 2013 Reggina gave up the remain 50% registration rights of Laverone to Sassuolo for free. However Laverone was allowed to join Serie B club Varese also for free.

Varese
Laverone was a player of Varese in 2013–14 Serie B.

Vicenza
On 26 August 2014 Laverone signed a 2-year contract (later extended to 4) with Vicenza for €500,000 transfer fee, which the club received a wild card to 2014–15 Serie B on 29 August. As part of the deal Tanasiy Kosovan was sold to Varese also for €500,000. Laverone wore no. 27 shirt for Vicenza. He only missed one match in the league that season.

On 12 August 2015 Laverone add one more season to his current contract, lasting to 30 June 2017. However, he was released on 4 July 2016.

Salernitana
On 5 July 2016 he was signed by Salernitana in a 3-year contract.

Ascoli
On 4 September 2018, he signed one-year contract with Serie B club Ascoli with one-year extension option.

Loan to Triestina
On 31 January 2020, he joined Triestina on loan with an option to purchase.

Ternana
On 24 September 2020, he signed a two-year contract with Ternana. On 31 August 2021, his Ternana contract was terminated by mutual consent.

Siena
On 25 January 2022, he signed with Siena.

Rimini
On 15 July 2022, he moved to Serie C club Rimini.

International career
Laverone received call-ups twice from the Italy Universiade Team for training camps, in 2009 and 2015 respectively. Laverone received a doctor's degree in November 2014.

References

External links
 Lega Serie B profile 
 

1989 births
Living people
People from Bagno a Ripoli
Sportspeople from the Metropolitan City of Florence
Footballers from Tuscany
Italian footballers
Association football defenders
Serie B players
Serie C players
Lega Pro Seconda Divisione players
Serie D players
A.C. Prato players
A.S.D. Olimpia Colligiana players
S.S. Arezzo players
Reggina 1914 players
U.S. Sassuolo Calcio players
A.S.G. Nocerina players
S.S.D. Varese Calcio players
L.R. Vicenza players
U.S. Salernitana 1919 players
U.S. Avellino 1912 players
Ascoli Calcio 1898 F.C. players
U.S. Triestina Calcio 1918 players
Ternana Calcio players
A.C.N. Siena 1904 players
Rimini F.C. 1912 players